AVOW is a German company that specializes in acquiring new users for app developers and brands. AVOW has partnerships with global mobile OEMs such as Xiaomi, Huawei, Samsung, Vivo, OPPO, OnePlus, and realme.

History 
AVOW was founded in 2018 in Berlin. It offers access to more than 1.5 Billion daily active users and is able to generate over 6 Million Monthly App Installs.

On 30 November 2020, AVOW announced a partnership with Xiaomi, in which they became a key marketing partner of Xiaomi outside of China. In April 2021, the company announced a partnership with another Chinese smartphone producer, OPPO.

In 2021 AVOW partnered with the smartphone brand Vivo with more than 400 million active users worldwide, and with Huawei.

In July 2022, Huawei Mobile Services and Kumu announced a collaborative partnership via AVOW.

In October 2022, Xiaomi made AVOW its official core agency for the EMEA, Southeast Asia, and LATAM regions.

References 

Companies based in Berlin
Companies established in 2018